Devići is a village in the municipality of Ivanjica, Serbia. It is located in Moravica District.  According to the 2002 census, the village had a population of 189 people.

References

Populated places in Moravica District